Unity is a volunteer-run organisation which provides support for asylum seekers and sans papiers in Glasgow, Scotland. The Unity Centre has been open since 2006 and is situated in Ibrox, near to the Home Office Immigration Centre.

Support
Volunteers are involved with a range of activities:
 Providing practical support and information to asylum seekers and their families.
 Taking details of asylum seekers reporting at the Home Office Immigration Centre so that their families, friends and lawyers can be alerted if they are detained
 Providing a night shelter.
 Running a bi-monthly group to help LGBT (lesbian, gay, bisexual, and transgender) asylum seekers adjust to life in Glasgow.
 Helping to organise demonstrations to highlight the treatment of asylum seekers in the UK.

Night shelter
Unity is one of the organisations involved in running Glasgow Destitution Network’s night shelter. The shelter provides temporary emergency accommodation for people who are not entitled to any other shelter or hostel. , the shelter has capacity for 15 male asylum seekers who have had their applications denied.

History
UNITY: the Union of Asylum Seekers  was formed in 2005, providing a focus for human rights issues at a time when the UK Government were using dawn raids to instigate deportations. Unity was involved with organising protests against this. The organisation had been involved with notifying when people were detained and sent to Dungavel or other detention centres. They have advocated alternatives to detention, especially where children are involved. They have campaigned against the enforced returns of Somalis.

See also
Immigration
Modern immigration to the United Kingdom
United Refugee Organization
No Border network
No one is illegal

References

External links
 

Organisations based in Glasgow
Organizations established in 2005
2005 establishments in the United Kingdom
Forced migration
Immigration to Scotland
Refugee aid organisations in the United Kingdom
Right of asylum in the United Kingdom